Algebraic statistics is the use of algebra to advance statistics. Algebra has been useful for experimental design, parameter estimation, and hypothesis testing.

Traditionally, algebraic statistics has been associated with the design of experiments and multivariate analysis (especially time series). In recent years, the term "algebraic statistics" has been sometimes restricted, sometimes being used to label the use of algebraic geometry and commutative algebra in statistics.

The tradition of algebraic statistics
In the past, statisticians have used algebra to advance research in statistics. Some algebraic statistics led to the development of new topics in algebra and combinatorics, such as association schemes.

Design of experiments
For example, Ronald A. Fisher, Henry B. Mann, and Rosemary A. Bailey applied Abelian groups to the design of experiments. Experimental designs were also studied with affine geometry over finite fields and then with the introduction of association schemes by R. C. Bose. Orthogonal arrays were introduced by C. R. Rao also for experimental designs.

Algebraic analysis and abstract statistical inference
Invariant measures on locally compact groups  have long been used in statistical theory, particularly in multivariate analysis. Beurling's factorization theorem and much of the work on (abstract) harmonic analysis sought better understanding of the Wold decomposition of stationary stochastic processes, which is important in time series statistics.

Encompassing previous results on probability theory on algebraic structures, Ulf Grenander developed a theory of "abstract inference".  Grenander's abstract inference and his theory of patterns are useful for spatial statistics and image analysis; these theories rely on lattice theory.

Partially ordered sets and lattices
Partially ordered vector spaces and vector lattices are used throughout statistical theory. Garrett Birkhoff metrized the positive cone using Hilbert's projective metric and proved Jentsch's theorem using the contraction mapping theorem. Birkhoff's results have been used for maximum entropy estimation (which can be viewed as linear programming in infinite dimensions) by Jonathan Borwein and colleagues.

Vector lattices and conical measures were introduced into statistical decision theory by Lucien Le Cam.

Recent work using commutative algebra and algebraic geometry
In recent years, the term "algebraic statistics" has been used more restrictively, to label the use of algebraic geometry and commutative algebra to study problems related to discrete random variables with finite state spaces. Commutative algebra and algebraic geometry have applications in statistics because many commonly used classes of discrete random variables can be viewed as algebraic varieties.

Introductory example
Consider a random variable X which can take on the values 0, 1, 2. Such a variable is completely characterized by the three probabilities 

and these numbers satisfy

Conversely, any three such numbers unambiguously specify a random variable, so we can identify the random variable X with the tuple (p0,p1,p2)∈R3.

Now suppose X is a binomial random variable with parameter q and n = 2, i.e. X represents the number of successes when repeating a certain experiment two times, where each experiment has an individual success probability of q. Then 

and it is not hard to show that the tuples (p0,p1,p2) which arise in this way are precisely the ones satisfying

The latter is a polynomial equation defining an algebraic variety (or surface) in R3, and this variety, when intersected with the simplex given by

yields a piece of an algebraic curve which may be identified with the set of all 3-state Bernoulli variables. Determining the parameter q amounts to locating one point on this curve; testing the hypothesis that a given variable X is Bernoulli amounts to testing whether a certain point lies on that curve or not.

Application of algebraic geometry to statistical learning theory
Algebraic geometry has also recently found applications to statistical learning theory, including a generalization of the Akaike information criterion to singular statistical models.

References

 R. A. Bailey. Association Schemes: Designed Experiments, Algebra and Combinatorics, Cambridge University Press, Cambridge, 2004. 387pp. . (Chapters from preliminary draft are available on-line)
 

 H. B. Mann. 1949. Analysis and Design of Experiments: Analysis of Variance and Analysis-of-Variance Designs. Dover.
 
 
 
 L. Pachter and B. Sturmfels. Algebraic Statistics for Computational Biology. Cambridge University Press 2005.
 G. Pistone, E. Riccomango, H. P. Wynn. Algebraic Statistics. CRC Press, 2001.
 Drton, Mathias, Sturmfels, Bernd, Sullivant, Seth. Lectures on Algebraic Statistics, Springer 2009.
 Watanabe, Sumio. Algebraic Geometry and Statistical Learning Theory, Cambridge University Press 2009.
 Paolo Gibilisco, Eva Riccomagno, Maria-Piera Rogantin, Henry P. Wynn. Algebraic and Geometric Methods in Statistics, Cambridge 2009.

External links 
 Algebraic Statistics

 Journal of Algebraic Statistics
 Archives of Journal of Algebraic Statistics

Statistical theory